Khaly Thiam (born 7 January 1994) is a Senegalese professional footballer who plays as a defensive midfielder for Hungarian club MTK Budapest.

Career

Club
Thiam started his senior footballing career in 2012 in Hungary with Kaposvári Rákóczi, making 25 appearances and scoring 4 goals in two years with the Nemzeti Bajnokság I team; he also played 13 times for the team's reserves in the second tier Nemzeti Bajnokság II. In 2014, Thiam joined fellow Hungarian top-flight club MTK Budapest and subsequently made his debut on 26 July in a league match against Pécsi MFC. 47 appearances and 3 goals in his first two seasons came prior to him leaving MTK to complete a loan move to Major League Soccer club Chicago Fire on 4 May 2016. He scored one goal, vs. Philadelphia Union, in twenty games in the United States before returning to Hungary.

On 25 January 2017, Thiam joined Süper Lig side Gaziantepspor on a three-and-a-half year contract.

On 21 August 2017, Russian club FC Dynamo Moscow announced the signing of Thiam on a one-year loan deal from MTK Budapest (as Gaziantepspor did not activate a buyout option). The Dynamo contract included a buyout option. The loan was terminated on 12 February 2018 by mutual consent after Thiam failed to establish his position in the Dynamo squad.

On 14 February 2018, he was loaned to the Bulgarian club Levski Sofia until the end of the season. On 2 June 2018, Thiam was permanently transferred to Levski, where he established himself as a regular starter. On 28 June 2020, he captained the team in the 2:1 away win over Beroe in a First League game, which had been announced beforehand to be his last match for the "bluemen". 

In August 2020 Thiam joined Turkish club Altay. In July 2022, Thiam joined Pendikspor where he remained until December 2022.

On 31 January 2023, Thiam returned to MTK Budapest, now in the second-tier NB II. He signed a two-and-a-half-year contract.

Career statistics

Club
.

Personal life
In an interview for Hungarian media in July 2019, Thiam announced he had sent his documents for a Hungarian passport since he moved to the country at age 18 and his wife, with whom they have two kids, is also Hungarian, and he also showed a desire to represent Hungary at international level.

References

External links
Player profile at HLSZ 
Profile in the official MLSZ database

Profile at Levskisofia.info

1994 births
Footballers from Dakar
Living people
Senegalese footballers
Association football midfielders
Kaposvári Rákóczi FC players
MTK Budapest FC players
Chicago Fire FC players
Gaziantepspor footballers
FC Dynamo Moscow players
PFC Levski Sofia players
Altay S.K. footballers
Pendikspor footballers
Nemzeti Bajnokság I players
Nemzeti Bajnokság II players
Major League Soccer players
Süper Lig players
Russian Premier League players
First Professional Football League (Bulgaria) players
TFF First League players
Senegalese expatriate footballers
Expatriate footballers in Hungary
Senegalese expatriate sportspeople in Hungary
Expatriate soccer players in the United States
Senegalese expatriate sportspeople in the United States
Expatriate footballers in Turkey
Senegalese expatriate sportspeople in Turkey
Expatriate footballers in Russia
Senegalese expatriate sportspeople in Russia
Expatriate footballers in Bulgaria
Senegalese expatriate sportspeople in Bulgaria